David Ryder may refer to:

 David J. Ryder, Director of the United States Mint
 David Ryder (sailor), Irish sailor